Sphaerophysa may refer to:
 Sphaerophysa (fish), a genus of fishes in the family Nemacheilidae
 Sphaerophysa (plant), a genus of plants in the family Fabaceae